In sports, garbage time is the period toward the end of a timed sports competition that has become a blowout when the outcome of the game has effectively already been decided, and the coaches of one or both teams will decide to replace their best players with substitutes. This serves to give those substitutes, who are usually less experienced or younger players, actual playing experience, as well as to protect the best players from the possibility of injury.

Garbage time owes its name to the fact that this period in a game is frequently marked by a significant drop in the quality of game play.  This occurs for two primary reasons.  First, the players involved during that time are generally less experienced, having not played nearly as often as the starting players.  Second, the fact that seldom-used substitutes usually desire more future playing time means that when those players do play, they are often more concerned with making an individual impression than with executing team play at its best; this is especially true during garbage time because at that point, the matter of which team will win has already been decided.

In some sports, there are so-called "unwritten rules" for garbage time which indicate that the leading team should neither continue to play its starting players, devote unnecessary effort toward increasing the size of its lead, nor attempt particularly difficult and spectacular plays. Doing so is interpreted as an unsportsmanlike attempt to embarrass or humiliate the trailing team, and in some cases may also be seen as retaliation, either against the opponent or the critics of the team in general (see running up the score for a more detailed explanation of this type of behavior). However, sometimes a team may have a legitimate motivation for running up the score, such as when margin of victory is a factor in rankings, as it was for many years in the Bowl Championship Series.

During garbage time, the trailing team can sometimes rack up an unusually high tally of statistics, leading the respective box score to be misleading with respect to their actual game performance. For instance, in American football, if the losing team is behind by several touchdowns, the offense may resort entirely to the passing game in a futile effort to catch up. At the same time, the leading team (on defense, with second or third string players) may allow them to complete plays (which benefits them by running out the clock). This may lead the statistics to indicate a high amount of passing yards for the losing squad, which would suggest the team performed better than in reality.

In some cases, both teams will use second or third string players in garbage time, and in college play, if first-string players are draft-eligible juniors or seniors, the second and third-string players will play to gain an advantage towards becoming first-string the next season. Sometimes the game experience gained by backup players during garbage time can be crucial to their development, since it is otherwise difficult for them to see playing time (especially certain positions such as the backup quarterback), although this experience comes with the caveats that garbage time is not a high pressure situation and that unusual strategies may be employed. Complementing this strategy, teams sit their first-string players during garbage time to give them more rest and avoid further injuries for future games. In baseball, teams losing by a blowout often use long reliever or even a position player as the pitcher; while the latter does save the bullpen for future games, 

In general, although not always the case, it is not unusual in American football for the losing team to have more passing attempts/yards than the winning team,  Often in the college game, a freshman quarterback will play during garbage time, after the upperclassman quarterback has put the game out of reach, gaining experience with second-string or third-string receivers and backs.

Particularly at the youth level, garbage time is eliminated by the use of a mercy rule, which automatically ends a game when the margin of victory has reached a point that is presumably insurmountable.

The phrase garbage time is one of a number of commonly used basketball terms, each of which is thought to have either been coined by broadcaster Chick Hearn, or first given widespread exposure through Hearn's adoption of it for use during his broadcasts.

See also
Resting the starters
Elimination from postseason contention
Untimed play

References

Terminology used in multiple sports